Jack and Jill is a 1998 Canadian anti-romantic comedy film, directed by John Kalangis. The film stars Kalangis and Shauna MacDonald as Jack and Jill, a couple in Toronto who decide to remain together in an open relationship after Jack calls off their engagement, and Kathryn Zenna as Veronica, the waitress at their local coffee shop who ends up as a sounding board for both Jack and Jill's feelings about their relationship.

The film premiered at the 1998 Toronto International Film Festival, before going into general commercial release in 1999.

Zenna received a Genie Award nomination for Best Supporting Actress at the 20th Genie Awards.

References

External links

1998 films
Canadian romantic comedy films
Films shot in Toronto
Polyamory in fiction
Films set in Toronto
English-language Canadian films
1990s English-language films
1990s Canadian films
1998 directorial debut films